Casy may refer to:

People
 Joseph Grégoire Casy (1787–1862), French naval officer and politician

Places
 Časy, Czech Republic
 Casy Island, Antarctica

Other
 CASY cell counting technology
 CASY, NASDAQ code of Casey's
 Jim Casy, character in The Grapes of Wrath